The Thiri Thudhamma Thingaha or the Order of Thiri Thudhamma (Thirí Thúdanma Thingăhá; , from ) was the highest Burmese commendation during the AFPFL era.  In that day, Burmese orders could be also used as titles.
Thiri Thudhamma Thingaha was founded on 2 September 1948. It is awarded in three classes: 
 Agga Maha Thiri Thudhamma – Grand Commander
 Sado Thiri Thudhamma – Grand Officer
 Maha Thiri Thudhamma – Companion

The first class consisted of a gold braided salwe worn over the right shoulder and across the breast with two badges of the order appended in the front, and also a large gold enamelled breast star. The second class consisted a single, breast star similar to the first class but smaller. Third class was a badge, worn from a ribbon around the neck. Generally speaking, the first class was conferred to the Head of State of the Union of Burma (1948–1962) and the Heads of State and Heads of Governments from other countries.

Recipients
U Ba U, Second President of Burma – Grand Commander
Bhumibol Adulyadej, King of Thailand – Grand Commander 1960
John Sydenham Furnivall, Burma public servant and historian – Grand Commander 1949
Haile Selassie, Emperor of Ethiopia – Grand Commander 1958
Louis Mountbatten – Grand Commander 1956
Sao Shwe Thaik, First President of Burma – Grand Commander
Norodom Sihanouk, King of Cambodia – Grand Commander 1954
Norodom Suramarit, King of Cambodia – Grand Commander
Marshal Josip Broz Tito, Yugoslav President – Grand Commander
Thein Sein, Eighth President of Burma – Grand Commander
U Win Maung, Third President of Burma – Grand Commander
Zhou Enlai, First Premier of PRC, China – Grand Commander

See also
Order of Burma
Maha Thiri Thudhamma
Pyidaungsu Sithu Thingaha
Salwe

References

Orders, decorations, and medals of Myanmar